Dennis Constable (14 August 1925 – November 2011) is a former English cricketer.  Constable was a right-handed batsman who fielded as a wicket-keeper.  He was born at East Molesey, Surrey.

The younger brother of Surrey cricketer Bernie Constable, Dennis made two first-class appearances for Northamptonshire in 1949 against Leicestershire and the touring New Zealanders, both at the County Ground, Northampton.  In the match against Leicestershire he scored 8 runs in Northamptonshire's first-innings, before being dismissed by Gerry Lester, while in their second-innings he wasn't required to bat.  In Leicestershire's first-innings he took two catches and in their second he followed up with another catch and a stumping.  Against the New Zealanders, Constable batted at number eleven in Northamptonshire's first-innings, being dismissed for 12 by Ces Burke thanks to a stumping off his bowling by Frank Mooney.  In their second-innings he wasn't required to bat.  He took a single catch in the New Zealanders first-innings and followed that up with another in their second.

References

External links
Dennis Constable at ESPNcricinfo
Dennis Constable at CricketArchive

1925 births
2011 deaths
People from Molesey
English cricketers
Northamptonshire cricketers
Wicket-keepers